Rubus canescens is a European and Middle Eastern species of brambles in the rose family. It grows in southern and central Europe and in southwestern Asia from Portugal to Iran, north as far as Germany, Poland, and Ukraine.

The genetics of Rubus is extremely complex, so that it is difficult to decide on which groups should be recognized as species. There are many rare species with limited ranges such as this. Further study is suggested to clarify the taxonomy.

References

canescens
Plants described in 1913
Flora of Europe